The Governor was the chief colonial administrator in the Bengal presidency, originally the "Presidency of Fort William" and later "Bengal province". 

In 1644, Gabriel Boughton procured privileges for the East India Company which permitted them to build a factory at Hughli, without fortifications. Various chief agents, Governors and presidents were appointed to look after company affairs in the Bengal region. In 1765, the Treaty of Allahabad granted the diwani of Bengal subah to the EIC. In 1772, Warren Hastings was appointed as the Governor General of Fort William in Bengal which ended the title of Governor of Bengal.

The Saint Helena Act, 1833 enacted that the Governor-General of India shall also act as the Governor of the Bengal presidency. From this time the Governors-General of India held also the separate office of Governor of Bengal, until the year 1854.

The Section 56 of Act 16 & 17 Victoria in 1853 empowered the Court of Directors of EIC to declare that the Governor-General of India shall not be Governor of the Presidency of Fort William in Bengal, but that a separate Governor shall be appointed for such Presidency. Until then, the Governor-General of India in Council will be directed to appoint a Lieutenant Governor of the Presidency of Fort William in Bengal. In 1854, F. J. Halliday was appointed as the first lieutenant governor of the Bengal presidency.

At the Delhi Durbar on 12 December 1911, King George V announced the transfer of the seat of the Government of India from Calcutta to Delhi, the reunification of the five predominantly Bengali-speaking divisions into a Presidency (or province) of Bengal under a Governor, the creation of a new province of Bihar and Orissa under a lieutenant-governor, and that Assam Province would be reconstituted under a chief commissioner. On 21 March 1912, Thomas Gibson-Carmichael was appointed the Governor of Bengal.  On 22 March the provinces of Bengal, Bihar and Orissa and Assam were constituted.

In 1947, India gained independence from the British Raj, and the new state of West Bengal was formed following the partition of India. C. Rajagopalachari was appointed as the first Governor of West Bengal. When the constitution of India came into effect on 26 January 1950, the office of Governor of West Bengal become a ceremonial position.

Precursors (1650–1758)

Agents, Chiefs and Governors (1650-1699) 
In 1644 Gabriel Boughton, procured privileges for the East India Company which permitted them to build a factory at Hughli, without fortifications. In 1650, the factories of Balasor and Hughli were united. On 14 December 1650, James Bridgman was appointed as the chief of the factories. However, in 1653, Bridgman left suddenly and Powle Waldegrave assumed his charge.

On 27 February 1657, the company resolved its holdings into four agencies:- Fort St. George, Bantam, Persia, and Hughli. George Gawton was appointed as the Agent of Hughly. Additional three factories in Ballasore, Cassambazar and Pattana were put under the Hughly agency. In 1658, Johnathan Trevisa was appointed as the second to Gawton and was meant to succeed him after the latter's death. On 6 February 1661, the company reduced the Hughly agency under the Fort St. George, and then agent Trevisa was made the "Chief of Factories in the Bay of Bengal".
On 24 November 1681, William Hedges was appointed as the "Agent and Governor for the affairs of the East India Company in the Bay of Bengal".  On 21 December 1684, William Gyfford who was the President and Governor of Fort St. George was given the additional charge of Bengal due to increasing mismanagement. John Beard was appointed as the "Agent and Chief in the Bay of Bengal" and become the subordinate to Gifford.

President and Governor of Fort William, in Bengal (1699-1705) 
On 20 December 1699, the Court of Directors (London East India Company) declared Bengal a Presidency, and then Agent Charles Eyre was made the " President and Governor of Fort William, in Bengal". The President or Chief in the Bay of Bengal for the English East India Company was Sir Edward Littleton in whose commission and instructions, dated 12 January 1698, it was also stated that power had been obtained from his Majesty to constitute him the "Minister or Consul for the English Nation" with all powers requisite thereunto.”  Littleton was later deposed by the Court of Directors in 1703.

The union of the two East India Companies took place on 23 July 1702. For united trade in Bengal, a Council was appointed, of which Nathaniel Halsey and Robert Hedges were to take chair each in their week alternatively as per the dispatch from United Company on 26 February 1702. In a dispatch of 12 February 1704, it was ordered that if Beard shall die, no one will be appointed as President to succeed him. After the departure of John Beard to Madras, Ralph Sheldon assumed the position of Chief of Council, and his appointment was confirmed in a dispatch of 7 February 1706.

President in the Bay, and Governor and Commander-in-Chief for Fort William, in Bengal (1705-1773) 
On 30 December 1709, Anthony Weldon was appointed as the "President in the Bay, and Governor and Commander-in-Chief for Fort William, in Bengal" for the United East India Company. His appointment was later revoked and was supposed to be succeeded by Sheldon. Since Sheldon had died by the time dispatch arrived in Bengal, John Russell was ordered to succeed as the Governor. By a letter of 8 May 1771, the Court appointed Warren Hastings to be Governor of Bengal. By Act of Parliament 13 Geo. III., cap. 63, the Presidency of Fort William in Bengal will headed by a Governor-General, and Hastings was appointed as the first Governor-General. He assumed the office on 20 October 1773.

List

Governors of the Presidency of Fort William in Bengal (1834–1854) 

By an Act of 1833 (3 & 4 William IV., cap. lxxxv., Section lvi), it was enacted " that the Executive Government of each of the several Presidencies of Fort William in Bengal, Fort St. George, Bombay, and Agra shall be administered by a Governor and three Councilors, to be styled the Governor-in-Council of the said Presidencies of Fort William in Bengal , Fort St. George, Bombay, and Agra respectively,  and that the Governor General of India for the time being shall be Governor of the Presidency of Fort William in Bengal. From this time the Governors General of India held also the separate office of Governor of Bengal, until the year 1854. Under the Charter Act 1853 the Governor General of India was relieved of his concurrent duties as Governor of Bengal and empowered to appoint a lieutenant-governor from 1854.

Lieutenant Governors of the Bengal Presidency (1854–1912)

Lieutenant Governors of the Presidency of Fort William in Bengal (1854–1912) 
Under the Charter Act 1853 the Governor General of India was relieved of his concurrent duties as Governor of Bengal and a separate Governor of Bengal shall be appointed. Until then a Lieutenant Governor will be appointed. F. J. Halliday became the first lieutenant governor of the Bengal presidency. William Duke served as the last lieutenant governor after which the office was superseded by the Governor of Bengal province in 1912.

Lieutenant Governors of the Province of Eastern Bengal and Assam (1905-1912) 
The Earl Curzon, the Viceroy of India, proposed the Partition of Bengal on religious lines into Hindu-majority Bengal and Muslim-majority Eastern Bengal and Assam and put it into effect on 16 October 1905. Dacca became the capital. The partition stoked controversy among Indian nationalists, who described it as an attempt to "divide and rule" the Bengali homeland. Sir Bampfylde Fuller was the province's first Lieutenant Governor. However, at the Delhi Durbar in 1911, King George V announced that the British government had decided to annul the partition. Eastern Bengal was reunited with western Bengali districts, and Assam was made a Chief-Commissionership.

Governors of Bengal  (1912–1947) 
On 12 December 1911 at the Delhi Durbar, King George V announced the transfer of the seat of the Government of India from Calcutta to Delhi and the reunification of the five predominantly Bengali-speaking divisions into a Presidency (or province) of Bengal under a Governor. On 1 April 1912 Thomas Gibson-Carmichael was appointed the Governor of Bengal. Sir Frederick Burrows became the last Governor of the Bengal province following the Independence of India.

Post-independence (1947–1950)

In 1947, the British Raj came to an end, and the new countries of India and Pakistan were created. Bengal province was partitioned into the state of West Bengal in India, and province of East Bengal (later East Pakistan) in Pakistan. East Pakistan later become independent in 1971 as Bangladesh.

Governors of West Bengal 

After the Independence, the state of West Bengal was headed by a Governor and his powers were laid down in the Government of India Act, 1935. On 15 August 1947, C. Rajagopalachari was appointed as the first Governor of West Bengal. When the constitution of India came into effect on 26 January 1950, the office of Governor of West Bengal became a ceremonial position.

Governors of East Bengal (1947-1955) 

Following the Partition of India, the muslim-majority part of Bengal province i.e. the East Bengal became the province of the Dominion of Pakistan. The Governor was the ceremonial head of the East Bengal province. The province of East Bengal was dissolved on 14 October 1955 when then Prime Minister Mohammad Ali Bogra implemented the One Unit scheme which merged the four western provinces into a single unit called West Pakistan while East Bengal was renamed as East Pakistan.

See also 
 List of governors of Bombay
 List of colonial governors and presidents of Madras Presidency
 List of governors of West Bengal
 List of presidents of Bangladesh

Notes

References

External links 
 

 
Bengal